The Angmering-on-Sea Open  was a men's and women's international tennis tournament founded in 1920 at Angmering, West Sussex, England that ran until 1938.

History
the Angmering-on-Sea Open was an international tennis tournament founded in 1920 at Angmering, West Sussex, England. The event was held at the first Angmering-on-Sea Lawn Tennis Club. The tournament was mainly played on grass courts except for the 1921 to 1923 editions which were played on clay courts. The tournament ended in 1938 due the outbreak of World War II the following year.

Finals

Men's Singles
(incomplete roll) included:

Women's Singles
(incomplete roll)

References

Defunct tennis tournaments in the United Kingdom
Clay court tennis tournaments
Grass court tennis tournaments